The  vestibular membrane, vestibular wall or Reissner's membrane, is a membrane inside the cochlea of the inner ear. It separates the cochlear duct from the vestibular duct. It helps to transmit vibrations from fluid in the vestibular duct to the cochlear duct. Together with the basilar membrane, it creates a compartment in the cochlea filled with endolymph, which is important for the function of the spiral organ of Corti. It allows nutrients to travel from the perilymph to the endolymph of the membranous labyrinth. It may be damaged in Ménière's disease. It is named after the German anatomist Ernst Reissner.

Structure 
The vestibular membrane separates the cochlear duct (scala media) from the vestibular duct (scala vestibuli).

Microanatomy 
Histologically, the membrane is composed of two layers of flattened epithelium. These are separated by a basal lamina. Its structure suggests that its function is transport of fluid and electrolytes.

Function 
The vestibular membrane helps to transmit vibrations from fluid in the vestibular duct to the cochlear duct.

Together with the basilar membrane, the vestibular membrane creates a compartment in the cochlea filled with endolymph. This is important for the function of the spiral organ of Corti. It primarily functions as a diffusion barrier, allowing nutrients to travel from the perilymph to the endolymph of the membranous labyrinth.

Clinical significance 
The vestibular membrane may be ruptured by an increase in the pressure of endolymph in the cochlear duct. This may occur in Ménière's disease.

History 
The vestibular membrane is also known as Reissner's membrane. This alternative name is named after German anatomist Ernst Reissner (1824-1878).

Additional images

References

External links 
 
 
 Overview at University of Wisconsin–Madison
 Image at University of New England, Maine

Auditory system
Ear